Ornativalva afghana is a moth of the family Gelechiidae. It was described by Sattler in 1967. It is found in Afghanistan and Mongolia.

Adults have been recorded on wing in June.

The host plant is unknown, but might be a Tamarix species.

References

Moths described in 1967
Ornativalva